The 2010 Piala Indonesia was the fifth edition of Piala Indonesia, the nationwide football cup tournament in Indonesia, involving professional clubs from Indonesia Super League, Premier Division and First Division. Sriwijaya FC was the tournament's defending champions. The winner of the tournament qualified to play for 2011 AFC Champions League qualification. RCTI was appointed as the official TV broadcaster for this tournament.

Sriwijaya FC became champions for the third year in a row after a 2–1 victory over Arema Indonesia in the final match at Manahan Stadium, Solo.

Regulation
Each club was allowed to play no more than three foreign players in each match.

First group stage

Group A
All group matches played in Palembang.

Group B
All group matches played in Lamongan and Gresik.

Group C
All group matches played in Karawang.

Group D
All group matches played in Kediri and Blitar.

Group E
All group matches played in Malang.

Group F
All group matches played in Surabaya.

Group G
All group matches played in Samarinda.

Group H
All group matches played in Jayapura.

Second group stage
In the second group stage, the teams that advanced from the first group stage were divided into 4 groups. Each group played in specific cities (Group 9 in Palembang, Group 10 in Surabaya, Group 11 in Malang, and Group 12 in Jayapura).

Group 9
Five group matches played in Palembang and one in Solo

Group 10
All group matches played in Surabaya

Group 11
All group matches played in Malang

Group 12
All group matches played in Jayapura

Knockout stage 
Each tie in the quarter-finals was played over two legs, with each team playing one leg at home. The team that has the higher aggregate score over the two legs progresses to the next round. Goal difference is the first tiebreaker used to rank teams which finish with an equal number of points. If aggregate scores finish level and goal difference are equal, then the team that scored more goals away from home over the two legs progresses. If away goals are also equal, 30 minutes of extra time are played. If there are goals scored during extra time and the aggregate score is still level, the visiting team qualifies by virtue of more away goals scored. If no goals are scored during extra time, there is a penalty shootout after extra time.

In the draw for the quarter-finals, teams are randomized. There were no seedings, and teams from the same group may be drawn with each other. The four group winners were drawn against the four group runners-up.

All times WIB

Qualified teams

Bracket

Quarter-finals

Pelita Jaya – Persipura 
First game

Second game

Persipura Jayapura won 7–1 on aggregate.

Sriwijaya FC – Persebaya 
First game

Second game

Sriwijaya FC won 2–1 on aggregate.

Persija – Persik 
First game

Second game

Persik Kediri won 5–4 on aggregate.

Arema – Persib 
First game

Second game

Arema Indonesia won 3–2 on aggregate.

Semi-finals

Persipura – Sriwijaya FC

Persik – Arema

Third place

Final

Top goalscorers
Cristian Gonzalez won the Top Scorer Award with 10 goals.

See also
 2009–10 Indonesia Super League
 2009-10 Liga Indonesia Premier Division

References

External links
(Official Website) Indonesian
(Group stage schedule) Indonesian
(Round of 16 Group drawing) Indonesian
(Round of 16 Schedule) Indonesian
(Quarter-finals drawing) Indonesian

2010
Piala Indonesia
Piala Indonesia